Château de Reinach is a château in the commune of Hirtzbach, in the department of Haut-Rhin, Alsace, France. It is a listed historical monument since 1990.

References

Châteaux in Haut-Rhin
Monuments historiques of Haut-Rhin